Perlis, (Northern Malay: Peghelih), also known by its honorific title Perlis Indera Kayangan, is the smallest state in Malaysia by area and population. Located on the northwest coast of Peninsular Malaysia, it borders the Thai provinces of Satun and Songkhla to the north and the Malaysian state of Kedah to the south. It was called Palit by the Siamese when it was under their influence. Perlis had a population of 227,025 as of the 2010 census.

The capital of Perlis is Kangar, and the royal capital is Arau. Another important town is Padang Besar, at the Malaysia–Thailand border and Kuala Perlis, the ferry town to Langkawi. The main port and ferry terminal is at the small village of Kuala Perlis, linking mostly to Langkawi Island. Another important lately developed area is Pauh Putra within subdistrict of Kurong Anai which houses the main campus of Malaysia University of Perlis and Politeknik Tuanku Syed Sirajuddin. Perlis has a famous snake farm and research centre at Sungai Batu Pahat. Perlis State Park and Gua Kelam are among the popular tourist attractions.

Etymology
It is unclear how the name Perlis came about. There are several hypotheses:
 According to a Malaysian historian, Mohd Yusuf bin Adil, the name comes from the Thai phrase "Phrao Loi" (Southern Thai: พร้าวลอย) which means kelapa hanyut (coconut washed ashore) since there were many coconuts found on the shores of Kuala Perlis. The phrase has been shortened by locals until it sounded like "pereleh" or Perlis.
 It has also been suggested Perlis may be a shortened form of a Malay word "peroleh" (obtain) as the state was a "gift" from Kedah, since it was a part of Kedah before becoming a state on its own.
 According to Negeri Perlis Indera Kayangan: Sejarah Pembentukan Sebuah Negeri Berdaulat by Ahmad Ismail, the name comes from a tree of the same name, which may have gone extinct.
 Some researches suggests the name is derived from a Northern Malay dialect word "perelus" which roughly translates as "foot falling into a crack", since Perlis is said to have a wide land filled with mud, and the people's feet may sink into the mud. 
 Additional suggestions include being named after someone, or derived from the French word "perlite" which means "rock" due to a huge rock near Sungei Perlis.

The honorific Indera Kayangan was given by Tuanku Raja Syed Hussin Jamalullail (who ruled Perlis from 1843 to 1873) after the royal town of Indera Kayangan II (1797 until 1813) he was raised in now located in Kampung Langgar, Kayang within the Kuala Perlis area. However, this epithet became less popular under the recommendation of Tuanku Syed Sirajuddin Putra Jamalullail in 2015, in which according to him is inline with the official singular name given in the state constitution his father signed without any long epithets in general "which is related to deities, or any 'Darul'..."".

History

Perlis was originally part of Kedah, although it occasionally came under rule by Siam or Aceh. Perlis was historically an important realm within the Kingdom of Kedah. Sultan Muhyiddin of Kedah made his capital in Kota Sena, while Sultan Dhiauddin II made Kota Indera Kayangan his capital. Sultan Dhiauddin II of Kedah was honorifically titled as Raja Muda of Perlis and Kedah, akin to the title Prince of Wales in the United Kingdom. During his reign as the Sultan of Kedah, he oversaw a treaty with George Leith to cede Province Wellesley to Penang. He was titled as Raja Muda of Perlis and Kedah. This fact depicted Perlis was a special realm within the Kedah sultanate.

Sultan Dhiauddin then made Syed Harun Jamalullail, father of the future first Raja of Perlis as chieftain of Arau as a wedding gift to his marriage with his daughter, Tengku Sofiah. Syed Harun's descendant will eventually become deputy governor (1839) and King of Perlis.

After the Siamese conquered Kedah in 1821, the British felt their interests in Perak to be threatened. This resulted in the 1826 Burney and Low Treaties formalising relations between the two Malay states and Siam, their nominal overlord. In the Burney Treaty, the exiled Kedah sultan Ahmad Tajuddin was not restored to his throne. Sultan Ahmad and his armed supporters then fought in a series of war known as Perang Musuh Bisik for his restoration over twelve years (1830–1842).

In 1842, the Sultan finally agreed to accept Siamese terms and was restored to his throne of Kedah. However, Siam separated Perlis into a separate principality directly vassal to Bangkok. The Siamese made Raja Long Krok as the Governor of Siam in Perlis while Syed (or Sayyid) Hussain Jamalullail as deputy governor. Finally, on 20 May 1843, the Siamese made Sayyid Hussain Jamalulail, the paternal grandson of a Hadhrami Arab Sayyid immigrant and maternal grandson of the Sultan of Kedah, became the first Raja of Perlis. This made Perlis as a sovereign state. His descendants still rule Perlis, but as rajas, instead of as sultans.

In 1897, Kedah led by its Prime Minister, Wan Mat Saman started effort to end the sovereignty of Perlis as what had become to the Kingdom of Kubang Pasu, which was returned to Kedah crown. After several tense occasions and disputes, Siamese King Chulalongkorn sided with Perlis. Perlis also had several disputes with the state of Setul before the 1900s.

As with Kedah, the Anglo-Siamese Treaty of 1909 forced Siam to relinquish its southern Malay vassal states of Kelantan, Trengganu, and Monthon Syburi (comprising Kedah, Perlis, and Satun (which remained with Thailand)) to Great Britain. The British installed a Resident in the Perlis Royal capital of Arau. Perlis was returned to Siam in World War II as a reward for Siam's alliance with Japan, but this brief annexation ended with the Japanese surrender. After World War II, Perlis returned to British rule until it became part of the Malayan Union, then the Federation of Malaya in 1957, and lastly, Malaysia in 1963.

Since 2000, the Raja or hereditary monarch has been Tuanku Syed Sirajuddin. He was the Yang di-Pertuan Agong of Malaysia from 13 December 2001 to 12 December 2006. Tuanku Syed Faizuddin Putra was the Regent of Perlis during the five-year period when Tuanku Syed Sirajuddin was Yang di-Pertuan Agong. The Chief Executive or Menteri Besar is currently Azlan Man of Barisan Nasional.

The Coat of Arms of Perlis consists of a sturdy green wreath of padi, indicating the wealth of the kingdom and the chief economic activity of the people.

The shield in the centre represents the pride of the people. Inside the shield is a ring of golden rice surrounding the name "Perlis" written in the Jawi script.

Government

Perlis is ruled by the House of Jamalullail. Unlike other Malaysian monarchical states, in which the ruler is a "Sultan", the Perlis ruler is called the "Raja".

Legislative power in the state is exercised by the Perlis State Legislative Assembly, a unicameral chamber in which all 15 seats are elected from single-member constituencies. After the 2022 state election, the Perikatan Nasional coalition, led by the Malaysian Islamic Party, holds 14 of the assembly's 15 seats.

Raja appoints Menteri Besar (Chief Minister) and an Executive Council (akin to a Cabinet). Generally, the chief minister is a member of the legislative assembly who can command a majority on the assembly's floor. The Raja's appointment powers were at the centre of a brief constitutional crisis in the state after the 2008 general election. The Raja sought to appoint a Barisan Nasional assemblyman, Md Isa Sabu, as chief Minister despite Prime Minister Abdullah Badawi, who led the national coalition, nominating the incumbent Shahidan Kassim to continue in office. The Raja prevailed, and swore in Md Isa, who proceeded to serve a full term as chief minister.

The state elects three members of the federal House of Representatives, for the constituencies of Arau, Kangar and Padang Besar. After the 2022 general election, all three seats are held by Perikatan Nasional.

The state also has two federal senators; like all other states, the senators are not directly elected but appointed by a vote of the state legislative assembly.

Perlis, being the smallest state by area in Malaysia, is not divided into administrative districts. Nevertheless, it is still divided into several mukims (communes), namely:

 Abi
 Arau
 Beseri
 Chuping
 Jejawi
 Kaki Bukit
 Kayang
 Kechor
 Kuala Perlis
 Kurong Anai
 Kurong Batang
 Ngulang
 Oran
 Padang Pauh
 Paya
 Padang Siding
 Sanglang
 Sena
 Seriab
 Sungai Adam
 Titi Tinggi (Padang Besar)
 Utan Aji; and
 Wang Bintong

Demographics

The ethnic composition for the year 2000 in Perlis was: Malay (174,805 or 79.74%), Chinese (21,058 or 9.6%), Indian (2,658 or 1.21%) and others (20,690 or 9.45%).

Religion

As of 2010 the population of Perlis is 87.9% Muslim, 10.0% Buddhist, 0.8% Hindu, 0.6% Christian, 0.2% Taoist or Chinese religion followers, 0.2% non-religious, 0.2% unknown / none, and 0.1% followers of other religions.

The Malaysian constitution strictly defines what makes a "Malay", considering Malays those who are Muslim, speak Malay regularly, practise Malay customs, and lived in or have ancestors from Brunei, Malaysia and Singapore. Statistics from the 2010 Census indicate that 83.6% of the Chinese population identify as Buddhist, with significant numbers of adherents following Taoism (3.4%) and Christianity (11.1%), along with small Hui-Muslim populations in areas like Penang. The majority of the Indian population follow Hinduism (86.2%), with a significant minority identifying as Christians (6.0%) or Muslims (4.1%). Christianity is the predominant religion of the non-Malay bumiputera community (46.5%) with an additional 40.4% identifying as Muslims.

Languages
Majority of Perlis' population speaks Perlis Malay which is a sub-dialect of Kedah Malay but also has its own unique features compared to those of neighbouring Kedah. Besides that there is also Hokkien, Mandarin, English, Tamil, Malayalam as well as small numbers of Southern Thai speakers, mostly ethnic Malaysian Siamese. However, large numbers of Perlisians regardless of ethnic origin mainly uses Perlis Malay as a lingua franca. In particular, Perlis is well known for its distinctive Hokkien language, known as Penang Hokkien. Hokkien serves as the lingua franca among the various ethnic Chinese communities in Perlis.

Tourism
Some of the tourist attractions in Perlis are:

 Perlis State Park – Situated on the longest continuous range of limestone hills in the country called the Nakawan Range, the park consists of Mata Ayer Forest Reserve and Wang Mu Forest Reserve with a total area of about 5000 hectares. Some of the attractions in the park include various caves such as Gua Kelam and Gua Wang Burma which is located within the 500-year-old Setul limestone formation.
 Kuala Perlis – One of the popular activities here is fishing. There are also many seafood restaurants that offer fresh seafood that is relatively cheaper than in the capital city.
 Gua Kelam – A limestone cave that used to be one of the most visited destinations in Perlis. Located about 33 km north of Kangar, the capital of Perlis state, near to a small town called Kaki Bukit (Foot Hill).

Recreation
There is an outdoor rock climbing in the limestone hills of Bukit Keteri with over 50 sport climbing routes that are bolted by the world's climbing team Mammut & Camp5; the crags split into 2 next to each other and the rockfaces rising up about 350 m. The range of difficulty is from beginner to expert and many varieties of climbs are available.

See also 

 Breakdown of State Seats Representatives elected 2018

References

Notes

External links

Official Perlis State Government web site
Tourism Malaysia – Perlis
Website of His Majesty, the Raja of Perlis

 
Andaman Sea
States of Malaysia
Strait of Malacca